The Truce is a 1997 film directed by Francesco Rosi, written by Tonino Guerra, based on Primo Levi's memoir, The Truce. The film deals with Primo Levi's experiences returning to Italy in 1945 after the Red Army liberated the concentration camp at Auschwitz during the Second World War.  This was Rosi's final film before his death in 2015.

Plot

Although liberated on January 27, 1945, Levi did not reach Turin until October 19 of that year. After spending some time in a Soviet camp for former concentration camp inmates, he embarked on an arduous journey home in the company of Italian former prisoners of war from the Italian Army in Russia. His long railway journey home to Turin took him on a circuitous route from Poland, through Russia, Romania, Hungary, Austria and Germany.

Cast
 John Turturro - Primo Levi
 Rade Šerbedžija - The Greek (Morda Naum)
 Massimo Ghini - Cesare
 Stefano Dionisi - Daniele
 Teco Celio - Col. Rovi
 Roberto Citran - Unverdorben
 Claudio Bisio - Ferrari
 Andy Luotto - D'Agata
 Agnieszka Wagner - Galina
 Lorenza Indovina - Flora
 Marina Gerasimenko - Maria Fyodorovna
 Igor Bezgin - Yegorov
 Aleksandr Ilyin - The Mongol
 Vyacheslav Olkhovskiy - Lt. Sergei
 Anatoli Vasilyev - Dr. Gotlieb

Reception
Whereas the film can be seen as belonging to the tradition of the "cinema of prose," it also contributes to the "cinema of poetry," as defined by Pier Paolo Pasolini.

Brian Webster, writing for the Apollo Guide, finds the film "a war story with little violence and virtually no sentimentality. If you're not ready for it, you might find The Truce passing before your eyes without making much of an impact. It doesn't smack you in the face with a powerful message, but instead works its way inside you more gradually."

The film opened on 71 screens in Italy and grossed $414,890 in its opening weekend, ranking sixth at the box office. In the US and Canada it grossed $71,448.

Awards
This film won the David for Best Director, Best Film and Best Producer at the David di Donatello Awards. It also won the Audience Award at the São Paulo International Film Festival.

It was nominated for the Palme d'Or at the 1997 Cannes Film Festival.

References

External links
 

1997 films
1997 drama films
Italian drama films
Films about Jews and Judaism
Films about the aftermath of the Holocaust
Films based on works by Primo Levi
Films set in Poland
Films directed by Francesco Rosi
Films scored by Luis Bacalov
Jews and Judaism in Italy
Aftermath of World War II in the Soviet Union
1990s Italian-language films
English-language Italian films
1990s English-language films
Latin-language films
Aftermath of World War II in Poland
1945 in Poland
1945 in the Soviet Union
Jewish refugees
Italian refugees
Displaced persons camps in the aftermath of World War II
World War II films based on actual events
Eastern Front of World War II films
1997 multilingual films
Italian multilingual films